Soccer, also known as football, is the most played outdoor club sport in Australia, and ranked in the top ten for television audience as of 2015. The national governing body of the sport is Football Australia (FA), which until 2019, organised the A-League Men, A-League Women, and still organises the Australia Cup, as well as the men's and women's national teams (known as the Socceroos and the Matildas, respectively). The FA comprises nine state and territory member federations, which oversee the sport within their respective region.

Modern soccer was introduced in Australia in the late 19th century by mostly British immigrants. The first club formed in the country, Wanderers, was founded on 3 August 1880 in Sydney, while the oldest club in Australia currently in existence is Balgownie Rangers, formed in 1883 in Wollongong. Wanderers were also the first known recorded team to play under the Laws of the Game.

A professional national league, the National Soccer League, was introduced in 1977. The NSL was replaced by the A-League, in 2004, which has contributed to a rise in popularity in the sport. Australia was a founding member of the Oceania Football Confederation (OFC) before moving to the Asian Football Confederation (AFC) in 2006.

History

19th century
An early match took place at the Woogaroo Lunatic Asylum, located in Wacol, on 7 August 1875, when a team of inmates and wards men from the asylum played against the visiting Brisbane Australian rules football club; the rules of the match which clearly stated that the "ball should not be handled nor carried" was a direct reference to British Association Rules.

A match was recorded to be played in Hobart on 10 May 1879, when members of the Cricketer's Club played a scratch match under English Association Rules, which were adopted by the club. The game was a return match to one played on 24 May by the clubs, under a variant of the Victorian rules; to prevent the disadvantage faced by the Cricketers, the clubs agreed that that Association rules would be adopted in the return match.

The first recorded match in Sydney under the Laws of the Game was contested between Wanderers and members of the Kings School rugby team at Parramatta Common on 14 August 1880. The Wanderers, considered the first soccer club in Australia, was established on 3 August 1880, by English-émigré John Walter Fletcher.  Later, in 1882, Fletcher formed the New South Wales English Football Association (also referred to as the South British Football Soccer Association), the very first administrative governing body of soccer within Australia and one of the first to be established outside the United Kingdom.

In 1883, Balgownie Rangers, the oldest existing club in Australia was founded; the club currently competes in the Illawarra regional league. Later that year, the first inter-colonial game was played at the East Melbourne Cricket Ground, between a representative Victorian team and one from the neighbouring colony of New South Wales.

As soccer continued to grow throughout Australia, John Fletcher's New South Wales soccer association gave inspiration to other states to establish their own governing bodies for the sport. In 1884, Victoria formed its own association, the Anglo-Australian Football Association (now Football Victoria), as did Queensland, in the Anglo-Queensland Football Association (now, Football Queensland), and Northern New South Wales, in the Northern District British Football Association (now, Northern New South Wales Football). In 1896, the Western Australian Soccer Football Association was formed. In 1900, a Tasmanian association was formed, and later, the South Australian British Football Association was formed in 1902.

20th century
It was not until 1911 that a governing body was formed to oversee soccer activities in the whole of Australia. The first such organisation was called the Commonwealth Football Association. However, this body was superseded by the Australian Soccer Association, which was formed in 1921.

Australia is regarded as the first country where squad numbers in soccer were used for the first time when Sydney Leichardt and HMS Powerful players displayed numbers on their backs, in 1911. One year later, numbering in soccer would be ruled as mandatory in New South Wales.

On 17 June 1922, the first Australian national representative soccer team was constituted by the Australian Soccer Association to represent Australia for a tour of New Zealand. During the tour the Australia men's national team lost two out of the three matches against the newly formed New Zealand side.

With British and Southern Europeans settlers it was immensely popular and this led to establishing soccer as a major sport in the country.

A distinct rise in popularity in New South Wales and Victoria, among other states, was linked to the post-war immigration. Migrant players and supporters were prominent, providing the sport with a new but distinct profile. Soccer served as a cultural gateway for many emigrants, acting as a social lubricant. Soccer transcended cultural and language barriers in communities which bridged the gap between minority communities and other classes within the country, thus bringing about a unique unity. The most prominent soccer clubs in Australian cities during the 1950s and 1960s were based around migrant-ethnic groups, all of which expanded rapidly at that time: Croatian, Greek, Macedonian and Italian communities gave rise to most of the largest clubs, the most notable being South Melbourne (Greek-based), Sydney Olympic (Greek-based), Marconi Stallions (Italian-based), Adelaide City (Italian-based), Melbourne Knights (Croatian-based), Sydney United (Croatian-based) and Preston Lions (Macedonian-based).

In 1956, Australia became a FIFA member through the Australian Soccer Association. Though Australia's membership was soon suspended in 1960 after disobeying FIFA mandate on recruiting foreign players without a transfer fee. In 1961, the Australian Soccer Federation was formed and later admitted to FIFA in 1963, after outstanding fines had been paid. In 1966, Australia became founding members of the Oceania Football Federation (now Oceania Football Confederation).

Pre-1960s, competitive soccer in Australia was state-based. In 1962, the Australia Cup was established, but its ambition of becoming an FA Cup style knockout competition went unfulfilled with its demise in 1968. In 1977, the first national soccer competition, the National Soccer League, was founded.

Migrants continued to boost interest in and player for the sport in the 1970s and 1980s, especially from the Middle East and from the former Yugoslavia.

In 1984, the National Soccer Youth League was founded as a reserve and academy league to run in parallel to the National Soccer League. In 1996, the first national women's soccer competition, the Women's National Soccer League was founded. The National Soccer League and those for women and youth flourished through the 1980s and early 1990s, though with the increasing departure of Australian players to overseas leagues.

Soccer reached notable popularity among Australian people during the second half of the 20th century. Johnny Warren, a prominent advocate for the sport, who was a member of the Australia national team at their first FIFA World Cup appearance in 1974, entitled his memoir Sheilas, Wogs, and Poofters (a reference to the Australian slang: sheila, wog, poofter), giving an indication of how Warren considered the wider Australian community viewed "wogball".

In the mid-1990s, Soccer Australia (the governing body for the sport) attempted under the Chairmanship of David Hill to shift soccer into the Australian mainstream and away from direct club-level association with migrant roots. Many clubs across the country were required to change their names and badges to represent a more inclusive community.

21st century
The sport experienced major change in the country in 2003, after the then Minister for Sport, Rod Kemp, and the Australian Parliament commissioned a report by the Independent Soccer Review Committee. Its findings in the structure, governance and management of soccer in Australia led the restructure of Football Federation Australia (previously Australian Soccer Federation, Soccer Australia, Australia Soccer Association) and later in 2005, the succeeding relaunched national competition, the A-League. The restructuring of the sport in Australia also saw the adoption of "football" by administrators, in preference to "soccer", to align with the general international name of the sport. Although the use of "football" was largely cultural, as part of an attempt to reposition the sport within Australia, there were also "practical and corporate reasons for the change", including a need for the sport to break away from the baggage left over from previous competitions. However, the move created problems within the wider community, engendering confusion due to the naming conflict with other football codes, and creating conflict with other sporting bodies.

Australia ended a 32-year absent streak when the nation team qualified for the 2006 FIFA World Cup. The team's qualification and success in the tournament helped increase the profile and popularity of the sport in the country.

The national team qualified for second and third consecutive FIFA World Cups in 2010 and 2014; and placed second in the 2011 AFC Asian Cup. The joining of Western Sydney Wanderers to the A-League in 2012 saw a rise in interest for the league within Australia, particularly increasing mainstream interest and re-engagement with disaffected Western Sydney soccer fans. Also, the formation of the National Premier Leagues in 2013 and subsequent restructuring of state leagues as part of the National Competition Review and Elite Player Pathway Review has paved the way for the development of the sport throughout the country. The launch of the Australia Cup (then known as FFA Cup) in 2014 has also similarly increased mainstream interest and grassroots development.

In the 21st century, a major migrant group furnishing new players in the A-League has been the African Australian community, with 34 players making an appearance in the 2020-2021 A-League season, up on 26 the previous year. These include Kusini Yengi and his brother, Tete Yengi, from South Sudan, and their friends, brothers Mohamed and Al Hassan Toure.

In 2020, Football Federation Australia officially unveiled a plan called "XI Principles for the future of Australian Football", with the aim to restructure and expand football across the country, with the rebranding of the domestic league, establishment of a national second division, alignment with FIFA Domestic Match Calendar, restart and rebuilding of Australian football products, reducing costs of football in the country, possibility of establishing promotion and relegation system, and expansion of women's football, with the aim to achieve the Vision 2035 for football in the country.

In summer 2021, Football Australia officials announced series of major reforms: the shift in calendar by aligning with Domestic Match Calendar and to avoid clashing with FIFA days so it could help the Socceroos to compete; establishment of a second-tier professional league; club licensing framework; domestic transfer system; as well a potential adoption of promotion-relegation system, expected to be implemented by 2022–23.

Organisation

Soccer in Australia is governed by Football Australia (FA) which is currently a member of the Asian Football Confederation (AFC) and the regional ASEAN Football Federation (AFF), since leaving the Oceania Football Confederation (OFC) in 2006. FA is underpinned by nine member federations which oversee all aspects of the sport within their respective region, including the organisation of state league and cup tournaments as opposed to national tournaments which are organised by FA. Member federations are state-based, although New South Wales is divided into a northern and southern federation.

Former and current Australian professional soccer players are represented by the Professional Footballers Australia (PFA), a trade union affiliated with the Australian Council of Trade Unions and a member of FIFPro, the global representative organisation for professional soccer players. The association tends to soccer players' pay and conditions, and also protects soccer players from unfair dismissal.

League system

A-League Men
The A-League Men was founded in 2005 after Australia's former top-flight national league National Soccer League was replaced. The A-League Men is contested between 12 clubs. The league covers the only competition controlled by the Australian Professional Leagues and the only professional league in Australia.

National Second Division
The National Second Division is the upcoming Australian second-tier professional division, and is expected to begin from 2024.

National Premier Leagues
The National Premier Leagues has 90 clubs, divided into eight divisions by state. Despite the organisational split, promotion and relegation does not take place between the A-League and NPL.

State-league soccer
Below the NPL, is what is commonly known as "state-league". This refers to clubs outside of NPL, although they still play in organised league competitions for each state in the Australian system.

District soccer
There are many district leagues and soccer clubs in Australia, examples include NSW districts Bankstown, Blacktown, Eastern Suburbs with their own semi-professional leagues with clubs from that district below state-league soccer

Youth leagues
Many club sides have youth teams. The top level of youth soccer in Australia is the A-League Youth, founded for all A-League Men clubs that have Youth sides. The league, which currently has 10 teams, is divided into two groups each with five teams. The winners of both groups contest the end-of-season Grand Final to decide the league champions.

Cup competitions
There are several cup competitions for clubs at different levels of the soccer pyramid. The only major cup competitions are the Australia Cup.

 The Australia Cup, first held in 2014, is the only major cup competition in Australia. It is open to around 700 clubs in levels 1–9 of the soccer pyramid.
 The Federation Cup, first held in 1962, is a Capital Football cup played through all levels of Capital Football teams.
 The Waratah Cup, first held in 1991, is a New South Wales cup played through all levels of teams from the NSW league system.
 The Canale Cup, first held in 1894, is the oldest knockout competition in Australia and is played through Brisbane teams below the National Premier Leagues.
 The Dockerty Cup, first held in 1909, is a Victorian cup open to all clubs from Victoria in the Victorian league system.

There have also been other cup competitions which are no longer run:

 Australia Cup (1962–1968) was for all teams from state leagues.
 NSL Cup (1977–1997) was for all teams that participated in a season of the National Soccer League.

Participation
According to FIFA's Big Count in 2006, a total of 970,728 people in Australia participated in the sport, with 435,728 registered players, and 535,000 unregistered players. These numbers were higher than the equivalents for other sports such as cricket, Australian rules football, rugby league and rugby union. In 2013, an audit on the sport by Gemba found that 1.96 million Australians were actively involved in the game as a player. When coaches, referees and fans are included it is estimated that involvement with the sport is around 3.1 million.

Men's national teams
National Men's soccer teams of various age groups represent Australia in international competition. Australian national teams historically competed in the OFC, though since FFA's move in 2006, Australian teams have competed in AFC competitions.

The Australia national soccer team, nicknamed the "Socceroos", represents Australia in international soccer. Australia is a four-time OFC champion, one time Asian champion and AFC National Team of the Year for 2006. The Men's team has represented Australia at the FIFA World Cup tournaments in 1974, 2006, 2010, 2014, 2018 and 2022.

In the Olympic arena, Australia first fielded a men's team at the 1956 Olympics in Melbourne. Australia did not compete again in the Olympic arena, until the 1988 Seoul Olympic Games. Apart from London 2012, where it failed to qualify a team, Australia has competed in all Olympic Men's Football competitions since 1988.

There are also a number of national youth teams: Under-17 team, nicknamed the "Joeys"; Under-20 team, nicknamed the "Young Socceroos"; and the Under-23 team, nicknamed the "Olyroos". The latter is considered to be a feeder team for the national team.

In addition there is a beach team, nicknamed the "Beach Socceroos", which represents Australia in international beach soccer and a Paralympic team, nicknamed the "Pararoos", which competes in international Paralympic association football.

Women's soccer

The participation of Australian women in soccer was first recorded in the early 1920s. It has since become one of the country's most popular women's team sports. As with the men's game, the women's game in Australia saw a large expansion following the post-war immigration, though it is only in recent years that women's soccer has gained momentum, with such factors as the creation of the W-League and the success of the Australia women's national soccer team nicknamed the "Matildas" aiding the increasing popularity of the game.

Women's soccer was added to the Olympic program in 1996, with Australia first fielding a Women's team at Sydney 2000. Australia fielded a team at the Athens 2004 Olympics, but did not qualify for the final Olympic tournament again until Rio 2016.

Stadiums in Australia

The Melbourne Cricket Ground is the largest stadium in the country with a capacity of 100,000. It is owned by the Government of Victoria and stages some of Australia's home matches. Docklands Stadium with a capacity of 56,347 is the largest club stadium, with Lang Park holding 52,500 and Kardinia Park holding 36,000. All A-League clubs play in all-seater stadiums.

Variations

Futsal, an indoor variant of soccer, was introduced in Australia in the early 1970s and soon gained popularity after a wet period during the winter football season forced players indoors where they took up the new sport.

Media coverage
Pay television is the predominant outlet for both domestic and international soccer in Australia. Some games can also be heard on local radio stations. The anti-siphoning list which controls what must be kept on free to air television in Australia includes only the FA Cup games. The A-League will be added to the anti-siphoning list, but not until 2014 in order to prevent a breach of contract on the part of FFA.

A A$120 million, seven-year broadcasting deal between FFA and Fox Sports gave the Australian sports channel group exclusive rights from 2007 to all Australia internationals, all A-League and AFC Asian Cup fixtures, FIFA World Cup qualifiers through the AFC, and all AFC Champions League matches. In 2013, FFA signed a joint A$160 million, four-year deal with Fox Sports and SBS for the A-League.

Since 1986, SBS has been the official Australian broadcast rights holder for the FIFA World Cup, and the television network will continue to hold the rights to the competition until 2022.

Seasons in Australian soccer
The following articles are an incomplete list of Seasons in Soccer in Australia since 1884. Each article covers the leagues and competitions played that season, as well as games played by all national teams during that period. National soccer in Australia was not played until the 1962 season as the first 78 seasons only played regional soccer.

Seasons in Top Flight
There are 52 teams that have taken part in 46 National Soccer League and A-League seasons that have been played from the 1977 season until the 2022–23 season. The teams in bold compete in the A-League Men currently.

 29 seasons: Brisbane Roar
 28 seasons: Marconi Stallions, South Melbourne
 27 seasons: Adelaide City, Sydney Olympic
 26 seasons: Perth Glory
 23 seasons: Wollongong Wolves
 22 seasons: Newcastle United Jets
 21 seasons: Melbourne Knights, Sydney United
 19 seasons: Adelaide United, West Adelaide
 18 seasons: Central Coast Mariners, Melbourne Victory, Sydney FC
 17 seasons: Heidelberg United
 16 seasons: Wellington Phoenix
 14 seasons: APIA Leichhardt, St George FC
 13 seasons: Melbourne City, Brisbane Strikers, Footscray JUST, Preston Lions
 11 seasons: Western Sydney Wanderers, Hakoah Sydney City East
 10 seasons: Brisbane City, Canberra City
 9 seasons: Newcastle Breakers 
 8 seasons: Sunshine George Cross
 7 seasons: Blacktown City, Brunswick Juventus, Newcastle KB United, Parramatta FC
 6 seasons: Canberra Cosmos, Northern Spirit
 5 seasons: Football Kingz, Parramatta Power
 4 seasons: Western United, Carlton SC
 3 seasons: Green Gully, Newcastle Rosebud, Gold Coast United, Macarthur FC
 2 seasons: Inter Monaro, Penrith City, Western Suburbs, New Zealand Knights, North Queensland Fury
 1 seasons: Canterbury Marrickville, Collingwood Warriors, Mooroolbark SC, Wollongong Macedonia

Largest Australian stadiums used for association football

See also

 Australian soccer league system
 Soccer records and statistics in Australia
 List of Australian soccer champions
 Football Federation Australia Hall of Fame
 Australian rules football in Australia

References